Cormobates is a genus of bird in the Australasian treecreeper family. 

It contains the following species:

References

 
Bird genera
Taxonomy articles created by Polbot